Diana Bang (born 1981) is a Canadian actress and writer. She played Park Sook-yin in the 2014 film The Interview. Bang has had regular roles on television in Away and The Astronauts (2020), Y: The Last Man (2021) and most recently in Resident Alien.

Life and career
Bang attended Burnaby North Secondary School, in British Columbia, Canada. Bang's sister, Andrea, is also an actress and writer. Their parents were Korean immigrants to Canada, and initially found it "distressing" that their girls had chosen to pursue acting for their careers, but have since been fully supportive.

Bang started her career in the Vancouver sketch comedy group Assaulted Fish before becoming an actress. In 2014, Bang played Sook-yin Park, a North Korean chief propagandist, in The Interview.

Bang starred as Dr. Allison Mann in the FX on Hulu series Y: The Last Man, which premiered in 2021.

Selected filmography

Film

TV Film

Television

Awards and nominations

References

External links
 

Living people
21st-century Canadian actresses
Actresses from Vancouver
Canadian actresses of Korean descent
Canadian television actresses
1981 births